

97001–97100 

|-id=069
| 97069 Stek ||  || Stefano Klett (born 1964) is a Swiss computer scientist and amateur astronomer who observes minor planets from his home town of Camorino. He is the promoter of the Ticino section of Dark Sky Switzerland. || 
|}

97101–97200 

|-id=186
| 97186 Tore ||  || Salvatore Silanus (born 1961), nicknamed Tore, is a friend of Swiss astronomer Stefano Sposetti who discovered this minor planet. || 
|}

97201–97300 

|-id=268
| 97268 Serafinozani ||  || The Serafino Zani Astronomical Observatory (Osservatorio astronomico Serafino Zani) in Italy was built by Serafino Zani and his family on San Bernardo hill in the commune of Lumezzane in Brescia, Lombardy, and then given to the local amateur astronomers. || 
|}

97301–97400 

|-id=336
| 97336 Thomasafleming ||  || Thomas Anthony Fleming (born 1960) is an American x-ray astronomer and educator at the University of Arizona's Steward Observatory. He discovered that DA-type white dwarfs were not copious x-ray sources, and he is known for creating and expanding interactive computer-based astronomy education. || 
|}

97401–97500 

|-id=472
| 97472 Hobby ||  || The Hobby Foundation supports museums and educational organizations throughout Texas. Ten thousand schoolchildren and members of the public a year view the wonders of the heavens through the Hobby telescope at the Houston Museum of Natural Science's George Observatory. || 
|}

97501–97600 

|-id=508
| 97508 Bolden ||  || Charles Frank Bolden Jr. (born 1946) is a former American astronaut who flew on four space shuttle missions (two as the pilot and two as the commander). From 2009–2017, he was the NASA Administrator. || 
|-id=512
| 97512 Jemison ||  || Mae Carol Jemison (born 1956) is a retired American astronaut who flew on the space shuttle in 1992. On the space shuttle she conducted scientific experiments. She was the first African American woman to travel into space and the first African American woman admitted into the astronaut training program. || 
|-id=582
| 97582 Hijikawa ||  || Hijikawa River is a 103-km-long river in the Japanese Ehime prefecture. It has its source near the Tosaka Pass in Seiyo City and flows into the Seto Inland Sea. With more than 470 tributaries, the river has supplied its abundant water to the people in the southern part of Ehime, especially for irrigation. || 
|}

97601–97700 

|-id=631
| 97631 Kentrobinson ||  || Ernest Kent Robinson (born 1939), an member of the advisory board at Lowell Observatory, enthusiastically spearheaded the capital campaign for a collection center and library to protect, preserve and make available the historic archives of that institution. || 
|-id=637
| 97637 Blennert ||  || John Blennert (born 1951) is a meteorite hunter in Tucson, Arizona, one of three co-discoverers of the Gold Basin Meteorite Strewn Field || 
|-id=677
| 97677 Rachelfreed ||  || Rachel Freed (born 1972) is a teacher, an education curriculum specialist, and an avid long distance runner. She works with the Astronomical Society of the Pacific as a volunteer and researcher. || 
|}

97701–97800 

|-id=786
| 97786 Oauam ||  || The Poznań Observatory of Adam Mickiewicz University (OA UAM) in Poznań, Poland. The observatory  was active in asteroid and comet observations starting in the 1930s. In the 1990s the focus shifted to physical studies of asteroids. Currently OA UAM is the main center for studies of small Solar System bodies in Poland. || 
|}

97801–97900 

|-bgcolor=#f2f2f2
| colspan=4 align=center | 
|}

97901–98000 

|-bgcolor=#f2f2f2
| colspan=4 align=center | 
|}

References 

097001-098000